Puccinellia nutkaensis is a species of grass known by the common names Nootka alkaligrass and Alaska alkali grass. It is native to North America from Alaska across northern Canada to Greenland and Nova Scotia, and down to Washington to Oregon to the Central Coast of California.

Description
Puccinellia nutkaensis is a perennial bunchgrass which is quite variable in appearance, taking a petite, clumpy form or growing erect to 90 centimeters in height with robust inflorescences. It sometimes roots at stem nodes that become buried in moist substrate, and forms dense stands.

A species of leafhopper, Macrosteles fascifrons, is associated with this grass in Alaska, remaining on the grass even when it is submerged amid icebergs.

Habitat
It is a plant of the coastline in wet areas with rocky, sandy saline soils. A halophyte, the grass is used for revegetation of salt marshes and other habitat in the intertidal zone in Alaska, where it is valuable for its tolerance of heavy inundation in cold saltwater during high tides and storm surges.

References

External links
Jepson Manual Treatment
USDA Plants Profile

nutkaensis
Bunchgrasses of North America
Grasses of the United States
Grasses of Canada
Native grasses of California
Flora of Alaska
Flora without expected TNC conservation status